HD 20781 d is an extrasolar planet orbiting the K-type main-sequence star HD 20781  away in the southern constellation Fornax. It was discovered in 2011 during a survey for southern exoplanets conducted with HARPS using doppler spectroscopy, the radial velocity variations caused by the gravitational pull of the planet. Its existence was confirmed in another survey during 2017.

Naming
This planet was initially reported in a 2011 preprint, which referred to it as HD 20781 b. However, the 2017 paper (published in a journal in 2019) that confirmed the planet designated it HD 20781 d, using the b designation for a different, shorter-period planet.

Properties

Orbit
HD 20781 d takes only 29 days to orbit its host star, classifying it as a hot Neptune. HD 20781 d is the second outermost planet in its system after HD 20781 e.

Characteristics
With a minimum mass 10.6 times that of Earth, it is probably a sub-Neptune, a planet that is larger than Earth but smaller than Neptune. Due to indirect detection, most of its properties can't be studied such as inclination, density, and temperature. Due to HD 20781 d's mass, it is estimated to be about 3 times larger than Earth.

References

Exoplanets discovered in 2011
Fornax (constellation)
Hot Neptunes
Exoplanets detected by radial velocity